Lake Prisaca is an elongated lake in the Cerna River in Caraș-Severin County, southwestern Romania. It is located about 6 kilometres north of Băile Herculane and northeast of Mehadia.

External links
Photograph

Prisaca
Geography of Caraș-Severin County